Krishnaraj Srinath (born 23 November 1969) is an Indian cricket umpire and former Indian cricketer. He represented Karnataka and Tamil Nadu in Ranji Trophy. He featured as umpire in U-19 ODIs. He has also umpired in Ranji Trophy, Vijay Hazare Trophy and Indian Premier League

Career
K.Srinath made his first class debut for Karnataka in 1991–92 and played for the state till 1993–94. In 1995–96, he moved to play for Tamil Nadu, the team he represented for a couple of seasons.

References

External links
 

1969 births
Living people
Indian cricketers
Indian cricket umpires
Karnataka cricketers
Tamil Nadu cricketers